Psilostrophe, the paperflowers is a genus of North American plants in the sneezeweed tribe within the sunflower family.

 Species
 Psilostrophe bakeri Greene - ID UT WY CO
 Psilostrophe cooperi (A.Gray) Greene - CA NV AZ UT NM, Baja California, Baja California Sur, Sonora
 Psilostrophe gnaphalodes DC. - TX, San Luis Potosí, Chihuahua, Coahuila, Durango, Nuevo León, Tamaulipas, Zacatecas
 Psilostrophe mexicana R.C.Br. - Chihuahua, Durango
 Psilostrophe sparsiflora (A.Gray) A.Nelson - green-stem paperflower, AZ UT NM 
 Psilostrophe tagetina (Nutt.) Greene - marigold paperflower, AZ UT NM CO TX, Chihuahua, Coahuila
 Psilostrophe villosa Rydb. ex Britton - NM TX OK KS

References

External links
 

Helenieae
Flora of North America
Asteraceae genera